Housefull 2, sometimes called Housefull 2: The Dirty Dozen, is an 2012 Indian Hindi-language action comedy film written and directed by Sajid Khan. Brothers Sajid Samji and Farhad Samji co-wrote the film under their duo Sajid-Farhad, based on a story by Sajid Nadiadwala. Produced by Nadiadwala under Nadiadwala Grandson Entertainment and distributed by Eros International, it is the second installment of Housefull franchise and a standalone sequel to Housefull (2010), and also an uncredited remake of the 1998 Malayalam film Mattupetti Machan.

Housefull 2 contains a large ensemble cast of over 80 actors with the primary cast including Akshay Kumar, John Abraham, Riteish Deshmukh and Shreyas Talpade. It co-stars Asin, Jacqueline Fernandez, Mithun Chakraborty, Rishi Kapoor, Randhir Kapoor, Chunky Panday, Zareen Khan, Shazahn Padamsee, Boman Irani and Johnny Lever. The story is set in  London.

Housefull 2 was released theatrically on 5 April 2012 with a massive budget of  It received mixed reviews from critics who praised the cast and humor but criticised writing, screenplay, cliches and direction. Nevertheless, the film was a huge economic success and accumulated over  worldwide becoming one of the highest-grossing Indian films at that time.

Plot
  
Sunny, Max, Jolly and Jai are best friends who study together in a college. One day in a party, Max's girlfriend Sonia gets attracted to Sunny and tries to make sexual relation with him. As Max catches them, Sonia lies to him that Sunny harassed her. It leads to a big fight of hands between the two, as Max slaps Sunny, and they both turn sworn enemies and part ways.

10 years later
Heena and Bobby are the daughters of two opposing Kapoor families who hate each other very much, just like their fathers Chintu and Dabboo who are half-brothers. They both want the richest son-in-law for their daughters and thus hire marriage counsellor Aakhri Pasta to find best son-in-law. He brings Rajendra Babani to Chintu for discussing Jai, who is his son.

Chintu misinterprets one of Aakhri's jokes who says Jai looks neither like his parents and may be illegitimate. His parents didn't hear Aakhri's comments; Chintu verbally abuses Rajendra while shouting. Rajendra suffers a heart attack, landing him in a hospital. Jai vows revenge and asks Jolly (being the son of a billionaire "JD") to go to Chintu, agree to marry Heena and then break off the wedding at the last minute.

However, Jolly is busy trying to introduce his girlfriend Jelo to JD and doesn't want to get involved. He suggests Max to pose as Jolly, who agrees. Jai and Max go but mistakenly end up in Dabboo's house, and later get to know know their mistake. Jolly then convinces Sunny to land in Chintu's house, and there becomes his bodyguard. Later, Chintu and Dabboo send Sunny and Max respectively with Heena and Bobby on a cruise for an animal safety event. However accidentally, all of them end up on an island.

In the process, Max and Sunny become friends again, and Heena and Bobby also sort out their relations. They find a resort and go home. Max gets engaged to Bobby and Sunny to Heena. Jai also falls in love with Parul Patel. Chintu blindfolds Jolly, Sunny and Heena, taking them to JD's house. After seeing Jolly holding Sunny's garland, JD assumes that Jolly got engaged to Heena. Luckily, Sunny convinces him. Jolly later reveals to Max and Sunny that his real name is Jwala, and JD was actually a dacoit almost 20 years ago. He also exposes that Parul is JD's friend Batuk Patel's daughter with whom JD had fixed his marriage 20 years ago.

As Sunny fools Chintu, he calls Dabboo in excitement and tells him that Heena is marrying JD's son Jolly (in real Sunny). Confused as believing Max to be Jolly, Dabboo takes Max and Bobby to JD's mansion. Sunny handles the situation well by fooling J.D. by taking the name of Goddess Bhadrakali as he is her true devotee, stating Max is Jolly's friend who is engaged to Bobby and Max's father is against their marriage. JD then welcomes all of them and tells to stay there till Bobby and Max's marriage. Batuk also finally arrives there with Parul. Jai and Jolly come to receive them from the airport. But when they see Parul, Jai and Jolly/Jwala lie that Jai is Jolly. Parul becomes happy hearing this as they love each other. J-Lo gives Jolly/Jwala the ultimatum  — take me to your house or forget me. To help Jolly/Jwala, Sunny lies to J.D., saying that J-Lo is his fiancée, and J.D. again agrees to let her live there as Sunny takes the name of Goddess Bhadrakali. Sunny and Max lie to their respective fathers-in-law that the other guy is the son of J.D. and a maid servant in the mansion, creating much confusion.

When Sunny's father (Ranjeet) as well as Max's 'Guru' tells them never to break anyone's heart, Sunny and Max tell the truth to Heena and Bobby. Enraged, Bobby and Heena slap Max and Sunny respectively and tell them that they never want to see their faces again. But thinking that instead of telling the truth, Sunny and Max could have done more wrong with them, the two sisters forgive the two boys on the very next day. There Jai and Jolly also let off their plan of revenge on Kapoors on Jai's father's advice. Then Heena proposes to Sunny in Sunny's style and Bobby proposes to Max in Max's style.

On the day of the four couples' marriage, J.D. and the other brides' fathers learn the truth about the grooms and that they have been lying so far. Finally, Bobby and Heena convince their fathers to forget their enmity and live together as blood brothers. Chintu and Dabboo join hands and so do their wives. But J.D. was not convinced by them telling the truth, so he turns back into Jagga Dacoit and starts frightening the families with his gun. He tries to shoot Sunny with his gun as Sunny runs towards J.D. to save him from the falling chandelier and then he understands what was happening. In the end, all the grooms marry their respective girlfriends.

Cast
Rishi Kapoor as Chintu Kapoor, Dabboo's younger brother, Sweety's husband, Heena's father, Sunny's father-in-law
Randhir Kapoor as Dabboo Kapoor, Chintu's elder brother, Dolly's husband, Bobby's father, Max's father-in-law
Mithun Chakraborty as Jagga "JD" Kanojia (Jagga Daaku), A feared ex-dacoit, Jwala's father, Jaina's father-in-law
Akshay Kumar as Sunil "Sunny" Pujari, Heena's love interest and later husband, Ranjeet's son, Max, Jwala and Jai's best friend, Chintu and Sweety's son-in-law
John Abraham as Max Mehrotkar, Bobby's love interest and later husband, Sunny, Jwala and Jai's best friend, Dabboo and Dolly's son-in-law
Riteish Deshmukh as Jwala "Jolly" Kanojia, Jaina's love interest and later husband, JD's son, Sunny, Max and Jai's best friend
Subhan Nadiadwala as Young Jolly
Shreyas Talpade as Jai Babani, Parul's love interest and later husband, Rajendra's son, Sunny, Max and Jwala's best friend, Batuk's son-in-law
Asin as Heena Kapoor/Pujari, Sunny's love interest and later wife, Chintu and Sweety's daughter, Bobby's cousin sister
Jacqueline as Bobby Kapoor/Mehrotkar, Max's love interest and later wife, Dabboo and Dolly's daughter, Heena's cousin sister
Zareen Khan as Jaina "Jelo" Malik/Kanojia, Jwala's love interest and later wife, JD's daughter-in-law
Shazahn Padamsee as Parul Patel/Babani, Jai's love interest and later wife, Batuk's daughter, Rajendra's daughter-in-law
Boman Irani as Batuk Patel, An ex-police commissioner, JD's best friend, Parul's father, Jai's father-in-law
Chunky Panday as Aakhri Pasta, marriage counsellor
Johnny Lever as Mithai Vishwasrao Patil, JD's loyal servant
Virendra Saxena as Rajendra Babani, Jai's father, Parul's father-in-law
Neelu Kohli as Dolly Kapoor, Dabboo's wife, Bobby's mother, Max's mother-in-law
Suparna Marwah as Sweety Kapoor, Chintu's wife, Heena's mother, Sunny's mother-in-law
Ranjeet as Dr. Ranjeet V. Asna K. Pujari, Sunny's father, Max's mentor and father figure, Heena's father-in-law
Ushoshi Sengupta as Sonia Luthra, Max's ex-girlfriend
Vindu Dara Singh as Sosa D'Costa, Jaina's boss
Malaika Arora Khan as Anarkali / Hetal / Sarla

Sequel and production
The sequel of Housefull was confirmed by producer Sajid Nadiadwala on 30 September 2010. The filming started on 9 June 2011 in London and Peterborough. The second schedule started from 1 October 2011 in Filmistan Studio, Mumbai and the last schedule was shot in December in Thailand, with one of the locations being the Sheraton Krabi Beach Resort. Sajid Nadiadwala hired a Hollywood action-set for Akshay Kumar's character. Asin Thottumkal replaced Deepika Padukone who was the female lead in the prequel as the lead actress.

Soundtrack
The full album released on 22 February 2012. The making of the song "Papa Toh Band Bajaye" was leaked to YouTube in early January 2012. Singer Abhijeet Bhattacharya filed a lawsuit against the film's producers, saying that the melody for "Do U Know" had been copied from his 2005 song "Baje Jo Bansi". It Got A Golden Kela Award for Most Atrocious Lyrics. The lyrics were penned by Sameer, and the songs were composed by Sajid–Wajid.

The film score was composed by Sandeep Shirodkar.

Release in India
Though the film was initially expected to release on 1 June 2012, it was announced on 30 September 2011 that the film would be releasing on 5 April 2012. The film had an earlier release in the UK on 31 March 2012 due to the Easter holidays. Housefull 2 got a 2700-screen release, the fourth largest release in the history of Indian cinema, behind Ra.One, Bodyguard and Don 2 and India's biggest release of 2012. Housefull 2 was screened in 1,027 UFO digital theatres on the first day when it released.

Critical reception

Though Housefull 2 response was more positive than its predecessor, it still received mixed reviews by critics. The Times of India gave the movie 3.5 out of 5 stars, praising the performance of Akshay Kumar and Asin. Taran Adarsh from Bollywood Hungama gave 3.5 stars and said, "If you are a movie-goer who derives happiness from loud comedies with over-the-top humor that defy logic at every opportunity, I am sure, you will relish this wacky slapstick. If your idea of watching a comedy is to have a good time at the movies, then Housefull 2 is especially designed for you." Mrigank Dhaniwala from Koimoi gave the film 3 out of 5 stars.  Kanika Sikka of DNA rated 2 out of 5 stars and wrote, "Go in with a promise that you'll be entertained, but don't expect an exhilarating journey." Sonia Chopra of Sify rated 2 out of 5 stars stating, "The physical slapstick comedy is straight out of a kids' movie, but it is charmingly daft. You cannot help let out a laugh or two. It's accidentally comic when you have a person with a bullet in his arm, but no one thinks of ringing for the ambulance. You see, long-winded, sappy moral science lectures are to be given at the very time." Anupama Chopra of Hindustan Times gave the film 2 out of 5 stars and said, "Housefull 2 has exactly the same mix of stars, foreign locations, farcical plot and spectacularly dim-witted comedy as the first Housefull. This is the cinematic equivalent of junk food - when you walk in, you know exactly what you're going to get." Raja Sen of Rediff gave the film 1 out of 5 stars and commented, "Housefull 2 is shamefully bad. So bad that Ranjeet—the rapey villain of yore—who appears in one scene, is the most dignified thing about the film." Rajeev Masand from CNN-IBN gave the film 1 out 5 stars and said, "Housefull 2 is for four-year-olds who don't know any better. For anyone with taste, or anyone seeking genuine laughs, there's nothing here."

Pre-release revenue
The music rights fetched an additional .

Box office

India
Housefull 2 had a good first day as it collected  nett. The movie collected  nett in its fourth day and  nett in its fifth day. The film collected  nett i its first week. Housefull 2 lost around  nett over the weekend due to the IPL matches and regional films. Housefull 2 had a big second weekend as it collected around  nett. The two-week business of the film is around  nett. It further collected  in its third week and crossed the  mark. It was labelled as a "super hit" by Boxofficeindia. Housefull 2 grossed  in India. It was the fourth most successful film of the year. Asin's third most successful film.

Overseas
Housefull 2 grossed  in 3 days in overseas and overall  in 8 days. It collected  overseas on Thursday and Friday. In UK, it collected £112,075 on Friday. In Australia, Housefull 2 collected A$73,143 on Friday. In New Zealand, the Friday collections were NZ$34,604. In the UAE, collections on Thursday were AED725,000. In North America, it was the second Hindi film to enter the top 10 after Kites, with $847,132, ranking at No. 9 behind The Hunger Games, American Reunion, Titanic 3D, Wrath of the Titans, Mirror Mirror, 21 Jump Street, The Lorax, and Salmon Fishing in the Yemen with a solid $7,001 average in 121 theatres. Housefull 2 grossed around $5.75 million in 17 days, becoming Akshay Kumar's second biggest grosser overseas after Singh Is Kinng. It became the highest grossing Hindi film in New Zealand, grossing NZ$ in three weeks, thus surpassing 3 Idiots and My Name is Khan.

References

External links
 Official website
 
 
 

Indian sequel films
Films shot in India
Films shot in London
Films set in London

2012 films
2012 action comedy films
Indian slapstick comedy films
Indian buddy films
Indian action comedy films
Films set in England
Hindi remakes of Malayalam films
2010s Hindi-language films
Films directed by Sajid Khan (director)
2012 comedy films